Ugia taeniata is a species of moth in the family Erebidae. It is found in Gabon and South Africa.

References

Moths described in 1894
Ugia
Moths of Africa